Serenitea Cha Kitchen Inc. (d/b/a Serenitea) is a milk tea shop chain based in the Philippines.

History

References

Further reading
 

Food and drink companies of the Philippines
Tea companies
2008 establishments in the Philippines